The 2007–08 Southern Professional Hockey League season was the fourth season of the Southern Professional Hockey League.  The regular season began October 25, 2007, and ended April 13, 2008, after a 52-game regular season and a six-team playoff.  The Knoxville Ice Bears won their second SPHL championship.

Preseason
The Pee Dee Cyclones moved from Florence, South Carolina, to Winston-Salem, North Carolina, and changed their name to the Twin City Cyclones.  The league also named a new commissioner, Jim Combs, in June 2007.

Regular season

Final standings

‡  William B. Coffey Trophy winners
 Advanced to playoffs

Attendance

President's Cup playoffs

Finals

Awards
SPHL award winners were announced March 24, 2008.

References

Southern Professional Hockey League seasons
2007–08 in American ice hockey by league